Vernon Systems Ltd (VSL) is a company that produces collections management software for museums, galleries, and other cultural heritage institutions. The company was established in 1985. It is based in Auckland, New Zealand, but sells its software internationally.

Vernon Systems has two major products, widely used by the museum community: Vernon CMS is a modular desktop package designed to manage all types of collections; eHive is a simple to use web-based cataloguing and public access system which includes integration with the WordPress content management system. eHive is free for low levels of use, with graded charges depending on usage. eHive is the foundation of the NZMuseums website, a public website presenting New Zealand's museums and galleries and their collections online, presented at the Museums and the Web conference in 2009.

VSL has partnered with museum organizations including Collections Trust in the United Kingdom. It also participates in major international museum events such as the Museums and the Web conference and in the United Kingdom at the Museums + Heritage Show.

References

External links
 Vernon Systems website

1985 establishments in New Zealand
Companies established in 1985
Software companies of New Zealand
Companies based in Auckland
Museum companies
Museum informatics